Potok  is a village in the administrative district of Gmina Szydłów, within Staszów County, Świętokrzyskie Voivodeship, in south-central Poland.

The village has a population of  410.

Demography 
According to the 2002 Poland census, there were 398 people residing in Potok village, of whom 50.5% were male and 49.5% were female. In the village, the population was spread out, with 25.9% under the age of 18, 33.2% from 18 to 44, 17.1% from 45 to 64, and 23.9% who were 65 years of age or older.
 Figure 1. Population pyramid of village in 2002 — by age group and sex

References

Villages in Staszów County